The 1909 Victorian soccer season was the first competitive season of soccer in the Australian state of Victoria, under association with the governing body of Football Victoria. The season consisted of one league made up of six 'district' teams from Melbourne that was known as the 'Amateur League'. This league season is recognized as being the first season of first tier Victorian state soccer that is now formally recognized as the National Premier Leagues Victoria, in which Carlton United were crowned as the inaugural premiers. The calendar season also saw the commencement of the Dockerty Cup, in which Carlton United defeated St Kilda 2–1, making United first club in the state's history to achieve both respective accolades in the same season.

League establishment
As interest grew from what was referred to as the 'British Association' sport, local businessman Harry Dockerty placed advertisements in both local Victorian newspapers The Age and The Argus in mid–1908 to unite all local enthusiasts of Association football (soccer). On 3 August 1908, the modern Victorian league system was established with the intention of commencing a competitive league in 1909. Along with a competitive league, a cup tournament was also established and was named the 'Challenge Cup', but was eventually renamed as the Dockerty Cup. There was no league final series to determine the league champions, nor a league cup tournament involving teams from the upper side of the premiership ladder. The first final series of any kind implemented by Football Victoria was introduced in the 1913 season for the second tier league, with finals being introduced for the first division league in the 1915 season.

The league was scheduled to consist of eight local clubs from Metropolitan Melbourne, being Albert Park, Carlton United, Fitzroy, Melbourne United, Prahran, South Melbourne, St Kilda and Williamstown, however only six of the clubs actually competed. In the recess between the last practice matches in September 1908 to the pre-season practice matches of April 1909, Albert Park was never mentioned in local media until early 1910, while it appears that South Melbourne was the second team to seemingly withdraw, despite playing practice matches only weeks before the season's commencement. In the following season of 1910, a club named 'South Melbourne' that would later rename to 'Albert Park' (and later as 'Glenroy'), competed from 1910 through to 1934. It is possible that this may be the same club or both the original Albert Park and South Melbourne clubs had merged, however this remains unknown. When a second division was established in 1910, a team under the name of 'Albert Park' competed but lasted only a solitary season. it is also unknown whether this particular 'Albert Park' was the same one to appear in 1908 or to be somehow connected to the 'South Melbourne' team that would later rename to 'Albert Park'.

Of the six clubs that competed, only Prahran still presently exists under the identity of 'Brighton Soccer Club'. While Carlton United, Fitzroy, Melbourne United, St Kilda and Williamstown all eventually folded, Prahran amalgamated with Brighton prior to the 1988 season, where the club's senior male squad presently competes in the Victorian State League Division 3, the sixth tier of Victorian soccer.

Overview

Dockerty Cup
The calendar season also saw the commencement of the Dockerty Cup, then known originally as the 'Challenge Cup', as the Federation's Cup tournament. The first ever competitive match took place at the Gardens Reserve in Williamstown on 24 July 1909, the same venue as the first ever first tier league match, in which the home team being Williamstown, were defeated 5-2 by St Kilda. In the grand final, league premiers Carlton United defeated St Kilda 2–1, making United the first club in the state's history to achieve both respective accolades in the same season.

Premiership season
The first ever competitive league match recognized by Football Victoria took place on 8 May 1909 at the Gardens Reserve in Williamstown. Hosted by Williamstown, St Kilda defeated the home team 3-0. The biggest defeat of the season was to be won by St Kilda over Williamstown again, this time by ten goals finishing at 10-0 during the sixth round of the season on June 12 1909 at Middle Park. The eventual inaugural league premiers was to be the undefeated Carlton United, finishing ahead of St Kilda by five points being exactly two wins and one draw ahead.

League Tables

1909 Victorian Amateur League

References

Football Federation Victoria
1909 in Victorian soccer
Soccer in Victoria (Australia)